Sociedad Deportiva Itxako, known as Asfi Itxako for sponsorship reasons, was a Spanish women's handball team from Estella-Lizarra, Navarre. Itxako were four times Spanish league winners and the EHF Women's Champions League runners-up.

History 
Itxako Reyno de Navarra is the professional top level women's team of the S.D. Itxako (Itxako Sports Society). The S.D. was founded in 1972. The women's handball department started in 1990 with a young age category team. Ten years later, in 2000, the senior team won the promotion to the top division for women's clubs in Spain, Honor Division.

Itxako's first appearance in a European competition was the Women's EHF Cup 2003/04. They were defeated at the eight-finals by Győri Audi ETO KC. In 2008 they finished second in the Spanish league, tied in points with the winner Elda Prestigio. Also during that season Itxako reached the finals of the EHF Cup but lost the title to Russian club HC Dinamo Volgograd. 2009 brought the first title of the club when Itxako secured the first place at the Spanish league. The success was doubled when they won the EHF Cup against German club HC Leipzig.

The club didn't enrolled any handball team for 2013–14 season as they are experiencing serious financial problems from 2011 after losing main sponsor Asfi. Finally, on 17 October 2013,  the club was liquidated by a court order.

Trophies
Spanish League (Liga ABF):
Winner (4): 2009, 2010, 2011, 2012
Runner-up: 2008
Queen's Cup (Copa de S.M. la Reina)
Winner (3): 2010, 2011, 2012
Supercopa de España
Winner (3):  2010, 2011, 2012
Spanish Cup (Copa ABF)
Runner-up: 2004, 2008
Semifinalist: 2008
EHF Champions League
Runner-up: 2011
Cup Winners' Cup
Quarter-finalist: 2006
EHF Cup
Winner (1): 2009
Finalist: 2008

Season to season

13 seasons in División de Honor

Notable former players 

  Macarena Aguilar
  Nely Carla Alberto
  Jessica Alonso
  Leire Aramendia
  Alexandrina Barbosa
  Andrea Barnó
  Svetlana Bogdanova
  Marion Callavé
  Oana Şoit
  Verónica Cuadrado
  Véronique Démonière
  Naiara Egozkue
  Begoña Fernández
  Deonise Fachinello
  Simona Gogîrlă
  Lee Sang-eun
  Vera Lopes
  Carmen Martín
  Mirjana Milenković
  Silvia Navarro
  Nerea Pena
  Elisabeth Pinedo
  Anett Sopronyi
  Raphaëlle Tervel
  Emiliya Turey
  Marieke van der Wal
  Maja Zebić

Notable coaches 
  Ambros Martín

Stadium 
Name: Polideportivo Municipal Tierra Estella - Lizarrerria
City: Estella-Lizarra, Navarre, Spain
Capacity: 2,000 seats
Address: La Merindad, s/n

References

External links 
 Official website
 European Handball Federation – S.D. Itxako

1990 establishments in Navarre
2013 disestablishments in Navarre
Spanish handball clubs
Sports teams in Navarre
Handball clubs established in 1990
Sports clubs disestablished in 2013
Defunct handball clubs